On 3 April 2013, the Taliban attacked Farah, Afghanistan, using bombs and guns.

Attack
On 3 April 2013, a group of militants began an assault on Farah, a city in western Afghanistan. The attack began at about 9am and centred on the city's courthouse. Wearing army uniforms, they blew up an army vehicle, damaging buildings - including the local governor's office and two banks. They entered buildings, then a machine-gun and grenade battle ensued between the attackers and Afghan security forces. Six attackers wore explosive belts. The death toll was 34 civilians, 10 members of the security forces and nine attackers. Another 90 people, most of whom were civilians, were injured.

Reaction
The Taliban said they carried out the attack and that they succeeded in freeing their prisoners. However, the province's police chief said that the insurgents failed in their attempt to enable the escape of 15 Taliban prisoners who were being transferred to the courthouse to be tried, as they are all accounted for.

References

2013 mass shootings in Asia
2013 murders in Afghanistan
2013 attack
21st-century mass murder in Afghanistan
April 2013 crimes in Asia
April 2013 events in Afghanistan
Attacks on bank buildings 
Attacks on buildings and structures in 2013
Building bombings in Afghanistan
2013 attack
Grenade attacks
Islamic terrorist incidents in 2013
Mass murder in 2013
Mass shootings in Afghanistan
Suicide bombings in 2013
Suicide car and truck bombings in Afghanistan
Taliban bombings
Terrorist incidents in Afghanistan in 2013
War in Afghanistan (2001–2021)